GSU may refer to:

Universities 
 Galatasaray University, in Istanbul, Turkey
 Gavar State University, in Armenia
 Georgia Southern University, in Statesboro, Georgia, United States
 Georgia State University, in Atlanta, Georgia, United States
 Gombe State University, in Nigeria
 Governors State University, in University Park, Illinois, United States
 Grambling State University, in Grambling, Louisiana, United States
 Gulistan State University, in Gulistan, Uzbekistan

Other uses 
 Azaza Airport, serving Gedaref, Sudan
 Gang Suppression Unit, a special unit of the Belize Police Department
 General Service Unit, a Kenyan paramilitary special forces unit.
 Genealogical Society of Utah
 Generator step-up transformer
 Geographically Separate Unit, in the United States military
 George Sherman Union, a building at Boston University
 Goldsmiths Students' Union, University of London
 Greater Sudbury Utilities, a Canadian power utility
 Gulf States Utilities, an American power utility